Modes of Transportation Vol. 1 is the debut album by Spookey Ruben, released in 1995.

Track listing 
 "Terra Magnifica" – 1:04
 "These Days Are Old" – 3:44
 "Crystal Cradle" – 3:51
 "Running Away" – 3:19
 "Welcome to the House of Food" – 4:59
 "Wendy Mcdonald" – 4:03
 "The Size of You" – 2:36
 "It's Not What You Do It's You" – 4:46
 "Mars" – 0:34
 "Leave the City" – 4:37
 "Growing Up is Over?" - 2:39
 "Donate your Heart to a Stranger" - 6:30
 "Life Insurance" - 5:01
 I)snowman
 II)deepsea-diver
 III)stolen car

Critical reception

In music site Allmusic, reviewer Stanton Swihart states, "As inventive as it is, the album perhaps draws a bit too freely from the XTC melodic bag of tricks, and occasionally Ruben's most experimental quirks sabotage his songs. But on the whole, Modes of Transportation, Vol. 1 is a confectionary treat."

Popular cultural impact 
The song These Days Are Old is used as theme song of German TV talk show Zimmer frei! (roughly: "room to let").

Production 
 Art director: Spookey Ruben
 All songs written, arranged and produced by: Spookey Ruben
 Engineers: Spookey Ruben, Gadi Foltys, Mark Plati, Brad 'Merlin' Nelson
 Mastering: Howie Weinberg
 Design: Helios
 Photography: Taralea Cutler, Michael Benabib Musician Photography , Luciana Haill, Felix Wittholtz, Spookey Ruben

References 

Spookey Ruben albums
1995 debut albums